Denis R. Norman (26 March 1931 – 20 December 2019) was a British-Zimbabwean politician who spent a total of twelve years in the Cabinet of Robert Mugabe. He was known as "Nothing Wrong Norman" due to his penchant for trying to put a positive spin on difficult situations.

From 2003 he lived in Oxfordshire, England, before his death on 20 December 2019.

Career
Norman headed the Commercial Farmers' Union when Robert Mugabe came to power in 1980. Norman was appointed Minister of Agriculture that same year, and held the position from 1980 to 1985. Mugabe asked Norman to leave the government after the 1985 elections which resulted in Ian Smith's faction winning most of the (minority-designated) white roll seats. The then-Prime Minister was aggrieved that the party which was sympathetic to ZANU-PF's cause did not win even though Mugabe had 'tried to appeal to the white population in Zimbabwe'. Norman proceeded to head the Beira Corridor Group, before being appointed to two positions by President Mugabe – Minister of Transport and Minister of Power – from 1990 to 1997. As minister of transport, Norman began introducing safety regulations for public transport.

References

1931 births
2019 deaths
20th-century Zimbabwean politicians
People educated at Bloxham School
White Rhodesian people
Rhodesian farmers
Zimbabwean farmers
Zimbabwean emigrants to the United Kingdom
British emigrants to Rhodesia
White Zimbabwean politicians
20th-century Zimbabwean businesspeople
ZANU–PF politicians